Mirall is a sculpture by Jaume Plensa, installed outside the Allen Institute in Seattle's South Lake Union neighborhood, in the U.S. state of Washington. Located at the intersection of Mercer Street and 9th Avenue North, the 2015 painted stainless steel sculpture includes two seated figures facing one another, each made of letters from eight alphabets: Arabic, Chinese, Greek, Hindi, Hebrew, Japanese, Latin, and Russian. Kurt Schlosser of GeekWire said the figures appear to be in a "perpetual, silent conversation".

See also

 2015 in art

References

2015 establishments in Washington (state)
2015 sculptures
Outdoor sculptures in Seattle
Sculptures by Jaume Plensa
South Lake Union, Seattle
Stainless steel sculptures in Washington (state)
Statues in Seattle